Veľká Mača is a village and municipality in Galanta District of  the Trnava Region of south-west Slovakia.

Geography
The municipality lies at an elevation of 124 metres and covers an area of 14.813 km².

History
In historical records the village was first mentioned in 1326.
After the Austro-Hungarian army disintegrated in November 1918, Czechoslovak troops occupied the area, later acknowledged internationally by the Treaty of Trianon. Between 1938 and 1945 Veľká Mača once more  became part of Miklós Horthy's Hungary through the First Vienna Award. From 1945 until the Velvet Divorce, it was part of Czechoslovakia. Since then it has been part of Slovakia.

Population
According to the 2011 census, the municipality had 2,603 inhabitants. 1,982 of inhabitants were Hungarians, 529 Slovaks,  11 Roma and 81 others and unspecified.

References

External links
https://web.archive.org/web/20080111223415/http://www.statistics.sk/mosmis/eng/run.html 

Villages and municipalities in Galanta District